Lego Chess is a Lego-themed, chess-based strategy video game developed by Krisalis Software, published by Lego Media, and released for Microsoft Windows in 1998.

Gameplay 
The rules of the game can be changed to cater to many popular variations, though the most common rules of chess are the default rules. During a game, clicking on a piece will show the available places to move to. If a piece is captured, a short video plays showing the captured character being caught, with each different capture having its own video clip. These clips are rarely related to chess. Because pawns, knights, rooks, queens, bishops and kings all have separate video clips for catching other pawns, knights, rooks, queens and bishops, there are 72 clips total.

Story mode 
In story mode, the player can pick either a western or pirates theme. After selecting the theme, a three-game chess tournament against the AI begins. In the first game the AI is at 25% difficulty, in the second game the AI is at 50% difficulty, and in the third and final game, the AI is at 75% difficulty. Before each match, a cutscene plays, ending with the protagonists having a task to complete. In the western theme, a sheriff is trying to capture three bank robbers, and in the pirate theme, a soldier is trying to beat some pirates to a treasure. After each match is over, another cutscene plays, with the protagonists either succeeding or failing the task, depending on the match's outcome. (Using the same example, either the sheriff catches a bandit, one for each match, or all of them escape.) After completing a story, a printable certificate is rewarded.

Tutorial mode 
The tutorial mode teaches how to play chess, from the basics of movement for the different pieces, to advanced playing techniques. The player is taught by "The Chess King", a Lego King Minifig who talks like Elvis, and who supposedly commands the white army. The Chess King slightly modernizes the explanations of the pieces. For example, it is said that the reason knights can jump over other pieces is that they ride BMX Motor Bikes. The King on his throne was also a Lego set, packaged with the first release of the game.

Versus mode 
In this mode, the player can choose the difficulty of the game when playing against the AI. Multi-player mode can also be selected here. Alternatively, the player can watch the computer play against itself. In addition, a third, traditional chess set (though still constructed from Lego bricks) can be chosen, and all three sets can be mixed (pirates playing against western, for example). However, animations for capturing pieces are disabled when playing with mixed sets. Players can also remove or add pieces from gameplay before or during the game.

Reception

Lego Chess received favourable reviews from game critics, stating its creative way of using Lego pieces as a "fun and entertaining way of playing chess." Other reviews were not as positive, due to the bland style of the cutscenes and claims that cutscenes featuring the tribal drum noise were "creepy".

References 

1998 video games
Chess software
Krisalis Software games
Chess
Multiplayer and single-player video games
Video games about pirates
Video games about police officers
Video games developed in the United Kingdom
Western (genre) video games
Windows games
Windows-only games